Litlington or Littlington can refer to:

People 
 William of Littlington (died c. 1310), English Carmelite friar

Places 
 Litlington, Cambridgeshire
 Litlington, East Sussex
 Litlington White Horse

See also 
 Lillington (disambiguation)